Samsung SPH-B5200 is a gaming phone first presented by Samsung in March 2006 at CeBIT. It features a 2.0-inch LCD color display, a 2.0-megapixel camera and a DMB receiver for mobile television. It was primarily designed for video games experience with its 3D graphics chip and features two D-Pads and a 3" wide-screen display. The device was aimed at the Korean market, but in November 2006 its release was cancelled, making it an example of vaporware.

See also
N-Gage
N-Gage QD
Xperia Play

References

Samsung mobile phones
Mobile phones introduced in 2006